Mina 25 is an album by Italian singer Mina published in 1983, as a double, album issued as "CD. 1" and "CD. 2 ". The album would peak at number 8 on the Italian music charts in 1983.

The Album
This is the first of four vocal collaborations with the RAI Radiotelevisione Italiana for the 30 years of our history TV broadcast. The TV broadcast retraced the history of Italy with the help of songs of the time (all contained on disc 1 of Mina 25). The same pattern would be followed on Mina’s next three albums: Catene, Finalmente ho conosciuto il conte Dracula... and Si, buana.

The song Verde luna had already been included on the album  Salomè and was re-recorded for this album.

Track listing

CD. 1

CD. 2

Other versions 
Only You: 
 Live version on television in 1968 available on the album  Extra Mina Vol. 1
A chi: 
 Live version on television in 1968 available on the album Signori... Mina! vol. 1

Musicians

Artist
 Mina– voice

Arrangements 
 Victor Bach – tracks 1-12 (disco 1)
 Massimiliano Pani – track 1 (disco 2)
 Mario Robbiani – tracks 4, 9 (disco 2)
 Celso Valli – tracks 2, 3, 5-8 (disco 2)

Other Artists 
 Mario Robbiani – strings
 Victor Bach – strings and wind instruments
 Bruno De Filippi – harmonica
 Simonne Sporck – harp
 Gigi Cappellotto, Paolo Gianolio, Massimo Moriconi – bass
 Ellade Bandini, Bruno Bergonzi, Rolando Ceragioli, Flaviano Cuffari, Walter Scebran – Drums
 Sergio Farina, Angel "Pato" Garcia, Paolo Gianolio, Ernesto Verardi – guitar
 Hugo Heredia, Paolo Tomelleri – clarinet
 Ellade Bandini, Maurizio Preti, Walter Scebran – percussion
 Aldo Banfi – synthesizer
 Victor Bach, Mario Robbiani, Celso Valli – Keyboard
 Piero Cassano, Lella Esposito, Giulia Fasolino, Gianni Ferrio, Naimy Hackett, Germano Melotti, Massimiliano Pani, Silvio Pozzoli, Wanda Radicchi – choir

References

1980 albums
Mina (Italian singer) albums